Allium galanthum is an Asian species of onion in the amaryllis family, commonly called the snowdrop onion. It is native to Xinjiang, Mongolia, Altay Krai, and Kazakhstan.

Leaves are tubular, about half as long as the scapes. Umbels are spherical with a large number of white flowers.

Allium galanthum is edible and reportedly has medicinal uses.

References

galanthum
Flora of temperate Asia
Onions
Plants described in 1842
Medicinal plants
Edible plants